{{infobox book | 
| name          = Alice Through the Needle's Eye: A Third Adventure for Lewis Carroll's Alice
| title_orig    = 
| translator    = 
| image         = Alice_Through_the_Needle's_Eye.jpg
| caption       = First edition
| author        = Gilbert Adair
| illustrator   = 
| cover_artist  = 
| country       = United States
| language      = English
| series        = 
| genre         = Fantasy
| publisher     = Macmillan
| pub_date      = 1984
| english_pub_date =
| media_type    = Print (Hardcover)
| pages         = 184
| isbn          =  0-525-24303-8
| congress      = PZ7.A1859 Al 1984
| oclc= 11891346
| preceded_by   = Alice's Adventures in Wonderland (1865) and Through the Looking-Glass (1871)
| followed_by   = 
}}Alice Through the Needle's Eye: A Third Adventure for Lewis Carroll's Alice is a 1984 novel by Gilbert Adair that pays tribute to the work of Lewis Carroll through a further adventure of the eponymous fictional heroine, told in Carroll's surrealistic style.

Plot

The entire plot consists of Alice traveling through the Alphabet as she goes along meeting new friends, or rather, creatures and obstacles. In the end, she awakes to find that not more than a few seconds have gone by and that it was all just a dream.

The story begins with Alice, on a winter continuously failing to thread a sewing needle. When she takes an extremely close look through the eye of the needle, she sees an unknown world on the other side, and finds herself falling through the needle's eye into this world. She falls into a haystack accompanied by frightened Country Mouse, who believes that she is a comet. The Country mouse hereafter befriends Alice and informs her that she is not in a haystack, but an A-stack, or rather a messy pile of A's. She spots a few spelling bees, makes her way out of the haystack and continues in the direction of an inviting beach.

Alice does not travel far before she meets two cats that are joined at the tail. The cats, called Ping and Pang, inform Alice that they are "Siamese-Twin Cats". They recite the poem "The Sands of Dee"; Pang forgets the last word of the poem, prompting a duel between them. But before their duel begins, the sky darkens and rains down cats and dogs. When the peculiar shower of animals has stopped, Ping and Pang realize that they must attend the "vote." Alice follows them to find out what the vote is about.

The chapter opens with Alice following the Siamese Cats towards the vote. Along the way, she meets an Elephant who gives her a ride to "Hide-and-Seek Park." Here, she overhears the conversation of the Grampus and the Italian Hairdresser (who speaks in Italics). A politician Emu gives a speech which is so brief that Alice misses it entirely. After Alice inquires what he stands for, he recites a poem about the letter "F". After this, the vote transforms into an auction, and with the final cry of, "Going...going...gone!" everyone abruptly vanishes.

The Grampus reappears and relates to Alice the story of his autobiography. He explains to Alice that he wrote down every detail into of his life into his autobiography years ago so that he wouldn't forget any of it. As per his autobiography, Alice accompanies the Grampus to miss the train and wait for the next one. The next event described in the autobiography is an attack by blood-thirsty brigands, who fail to show, so he asks Alice to perform their role instead. Soon after, she "rescues" him and they board the next train. As they ride the train, the Grampus reveals that they are due to be swept up in a hurricane, according to the autobiography. Alice, not wanting to "create" a hurricane, resolves to simply write the word 'not' into his book. The train suddenly turns into a study room and, out of curiosity, Alice ventures out to discover what might lie upon the hill she had spotted in the distance.

When starting to climb the hill, Alice bumps into two 'stick figure people' who she soon identifies as Jack and Jill from the nursery rhyme. Jack reveals that the pail of water from the well actually holds eels or "L's" for delivering to Llanfairpwllgwyngyllgogerychwyrndrobwllllantysiliogogogoch. He demands Alice to deliver these, so sets off to do so.

Alice soon reaches a maze-like place with a sign that reads "Llabyrinth". To Alice's frustration, she cannot find the center of the maze, as she comes across several confusing signs, many of which leading her back to the same place she was before. After a moment of despondency, she hears the Country Mouse; she attempts to follow it, but to no avail. She also attempts to throw one of the eels over the hedge as a signal, but fails, as it comes back like a boomerang. Eventually, she drops off to sleep. When she awakes, she sees somebody running past her and gives chase. They leard her to the center of the maze where a large congregation of animals are hopelessly lost.

Alice is volunteered by the animals to go into a rabbit hole which the cluster of animals within the maze believe leads out. When going down the hole, she feels as if she is falling sideways and soon is rocketed out of the exit hole like a canon.

She finds herself in a queue between two small buildings, occupied in part by the Red and White Queens from her previous adventures. Every time they work their way up the queue to one of the small buildings, it closes its operations and directs them to visit the opposite building instead. The length of the queue joining both buildings gets smaller and smaller until Alice finally manages to actually speak to the owner of one of the buildings, who is a butterfly still in his chrysalis. He sells her a postage stamp and flutters away.

As she inspects the postage stamp, she suddenly finds herself in a restaurant called The King's Head. A frog waiter departs to prepare lukewarm tea for Alice, and in the meantime she converses with a snake who eats his own tail. When the waiter returns, Alice orders "Swan Pie and Greens" from the menu, which summons a living swan to approach and prepare itself to be cooked alive. She attempts to change her order, which offends the swan, when the group is interrupted by a voice declaring the "Grand Opening of Parliament!"

Alice makes her way to a solemn procession, including the Grampus, making their way to the Hall of Parliament, accompanied by a swarm of personified letters of the alphabet. When they arrive, the Emu emerges and hears the complaints of a Lord X, who argues that it's unfair for the later letters (V, W, X, Y and Z) to be very rarely used or named in common conversation. The debate escalates into a violent and senseless battle. When Alice tries to intervene, the letters turn on her, prompting her to awake in a panic.

Realizing it was only a dream, Alice talks in a hush to her sleeping cat about her adventures.

Characters
These are the main characters listed in order of appearance
 Alice Liddell
 Country Mouse
 Ping
 Pang
 Grampus
 Hairdresser
 Jack
 Jill
 Welsh Rabbit
 Otter
 Kangaroo
 Red Queen
 White Queen
 Frog Waiter
 Swan
 Mr. Snake
 Letter Lords

Connections to Wonderland
There are several references and homages to Lewis Carroll's novels Alice's Adventures in Wonderland (1865) and Through the Looking-Glass (1871). For example, Dinah appears in the beginning, and there is once again a mouse within the plot. In the scene concerning the Llabyrinth, she chases a rabbit and encounters a hole which she must enter.

Bibliography
Adair, G. (1985) Alice Through the Needle's Eye: A Third Adventure for Lewis Carroll's Alice'' 

1984 American novels
1984 fantasy novels
Novels by Gilbert Adair
American fantasy novels
Books based on Alice in Wonderland
Macmillan Publishers books
American children's novels
Children's fantasy novels
1984 children's books
Sequel novels
Cultural depictions of Alice Liddell